Notre-Dame-du-Bon-Conseil is a parish municipality located in the Drummond Regional County Municipality in the Centre-du-Quebec region of Quebec. The population as of the Canada 2021 Census was 885. The municipality completely encircles the village that is also called Notre-Dame-du-Bon-Conseil.

Demographics 

Population trend:

Mother tongue language (2006)

See also
 List of parish municipalities in Quebec

References

Parish municipalities in Quebec
Incorporated places in Centre-du-Québec